Rong Chang is a tambon (subdistrict) of Pa Daet District, in Chiang Rai Province, Thailand. In 2018 it had a total population of 4,738 people.

History
The subdistrict was created effective August 7, 1987 by splitting off 8 administrative villages from Pa Daet.

Administration

Central administration
The tambon is subdivided into 12 administrative villages (muban).

Local administration
The whole area of the subdistrict is covered by the subdistrict municipality (Thesaban Tambon) Rong Chang (เทศบาลตำบลโรงช้าง).

References

External links
Thaitambon.com on Rong Chang

Tambon of Chiang Rai province
Populated places in Chiang Rai province